San Antonio is a suburb of capital city Salto of the Salto Department in northwestern Uruguay.

San Antonio is also the name of the municipality to which the suburb belongs.

Geography
The stream Arroyo San Antonio Grande flows near the suburb.

Population
In 2011 San Antonio had a population of 877.

 
Source: Instituto Nacional de Estadística de Uruguay

References

External links
INE map of San Antonio

Populated places in the Salto Department